Bandha Pasam is a 1962 Indian Tamil-language drama film directed by A. Bhimsingh and produced by Periyanna. The film stars Sivaji Ganesan, Gemini Ganesan, Savitri and Devika. It was released on 27 October 1962.

Plot 
Parthiban, a student-writer, and Saravanan, a student are the sons of Vedhachalam and Meenakshi. It is a very close knit, loving and caring family. Vedhachalam runs a successful business that runs in lakhs. Due to misfortune, Vedhachalam loses all his money as the bank he used for deposit declares bankruptcy leaving him paraplegic in shock. 

Parthiban, during a case of mistaken identity, meets Manonmani, falls in love with her and with her help starts working in a press. Her boss's daughter, Poonkodi is the lover of Saravanan and they have parted ways due to her hasty nature of misreading Saravanan's situation. 

How the situation gets resolved with the couples getting united and the family getting back their footing is the rest of the story.

Cast 
Sivaji Ganesan as Parthiban
Gemini Ganesan as Saravanan
Savitri as Poonkodi
Devika as Manonmani
S. V. Ranga Rao as Vedhachalam
M. V. Rajamma as Meenakshi
V. K. Ramasamy as Chithra's father
J. P. Chandrababu as Vasu
Sukumari as Chithra
Chandrakantha as Gowri
M. R. Santhanam as Thandavarayan Pillai
'Kottappuli' Jayaraman as Editor

Soundtrack 
The music was composed by Viswanathan–Ramamoorthy. The "Pandhal Irundhaal Kodi Padarum" song's pallavi is loosely based on "Eternally", composed by Charlie Chaplin.

Release and reception 
Bandha Pasam was released on 27 October 1962. Kanthan of Kalki appreciated the performances of the cast, particularly Devika, Ranga Rao and Rajamma, but criticised the music and the title's lack of relevance to the story.

References

External links 
 

1960s Tamil-language films
1962 drama films
1962 films
Films directed by A. Bhimsingh
Films scored by Viswanathan–Ramamoorthy
Indian drama films